The Carpe Diem Trust is a UK-based charitable trust. It was registered on 4 July 2006 with the UK Charity Commission, with the registered number 1115061.

According to the Trust's website its purpose is:

The Carpe Diem Trust is a new charity, due to begin operation in the second half of 2007. It will be a grant awarding body aimed at helping and motivating ordinary people to take control of their lives and to stretch the boundaries of their potential further than they thought possible.

References

External links
 The Carpe Diem Trust website
 

Charities based in the United Kingdom
Charitable trusts
2006 establishments in the United Kingdom